Lakeshore Technical College (LTC) is a public community college in Cleveland, Wisconsin. It is part of the Wisconsin Technical College System. The college offers associate degree and technical diploma programs as well as certifications and adult continuing education programs.

History 
In 1960, the former Sheboygan Central High School was renovated and the building was converted to house Sheboygan Vocational and Adult Education and the administrative offices of the Sheboygan Area School District.

In 1968, the Sheboygan School of Vocational and Adult Education was renamed to Lakeshore Technical Institute (LTI). In 1974, LTI's main campus in Cleveland opened, constructed at a cost of $5 million.
 
In 1978, student housing was first proposed at the Cleveland campus. In 1981, LTI's board of directors decided against being directly involved in student housing but in March 1990, the board endorsed a proposal to develop housing on a five-acre property just south of the campus along North Avenue.

In 1988, LTI changed its name to Lakeshore Technical College to reflect a shift in course offerings.

Images

Notable alumni
Trevor Casper, Wisconsin State Trooper
Terry Van Akkeren, former mayor of Sheboygan and former member of the Wisconsin State Assembly

Notes

External links

Official website
 

Wisconsin technical colleges
Education in Sheboygan, Wisconsin
Educational institutions established in 1967
Education in Manitowoc County, Wisconsin
1967 establishments in Wisconsin